Acapulco is a district of the Puntarenas canton, in the Puntarenas province of Costa Rica.

History 
Acapulco was created on 18 June 1999 by Decreto Ejecutivo 28000-G.

Geography 
Acapulco has an area of  km2 and an elevation of  metres.

Demographics 

For the 2011 census, Acapulco had a population of  inhabitants.

Transportation

Road transportation 
The district is covered by the following road routes:
 National Route 1
 National Route 606

References 

Districts of Puntarenas Province
Populated places in Puntarenas Province